Muhafızgücü SK were a Turkish sports club based in Ankara, Turkey. The club was founded in Ankara after order by Mustafa Kemal Atatürk on July 18, 1920. The club was founded under the name Muhafız Alayı by Mülazım İsmail Hakkı Bey as chairman. On 1 June 1923, the club's name was changed to Muhafızgücü. Muhafızgücü were active in football, basketball, athletics, equestrianism, cycling, polo, and volleyball. 
They achieved their greatest success in football, when they became Turkish champions in 1927 and in basketball, as they won the Turkish League in the 1973–74 season.

Since Muhafızgücü were a military club their colors were red and white, the colors of the Turkish flag. The club was dissolved in 1981.

Honours
  
In Turkey, Muhafızgücü are one of three sports clubs who have won national championships in football, basketball, and volleyball.

Football
 Turkish Football Championship
 Winners (1): 1927

 Ankara Football League
 Winners (5): 1924-25, 1925-26, 1926-27, 1927-28, 1928-29
 Runners-up (6): 1924, 1932–33, 1934–35, 1937–38, 1939–40, 1945–46

Basketball
 Turkish Basketball League
 Winners (1): 1973–74

 Turkish Basketball Cup
 Runners-up (2): 1966–67, 1967–68

Volleyball
 Turkish Volleyball League
 Winners (1): 1974–75

 Turkish Volleyball Championship
 Winners (2): 1968, 1969
 Runners-up (2): 1965, 1967

References

Defunct football clubs in Turkey
Sports clubs established in 1920
Sports teams in Ankara
1920 establishments in the Ottoman Empire
Military sports clubs
Multi-sport clubs in Turkey